All Day and a Night is a 2020 American drama film written and directed by Joe Robert Cole. It stars Jeffrey Wright, Ashton Sanders and Yahya Abdul-Mateen II.

It was released on May 1, 2020, by Netflix.

Plot
An aspiring rapper named Jahkor Lincoln (Ashton Sanders) arrives in prison. He ends up serving a life sentence for murder and looks back on the days preceding his arrest and the circumstances of his childhood to find clues to his way forward in life and his survival.

During his childhood (Jadyn Emil Hall), he suffered abuse from his father JD (Jeffrey Wright), who was a drug addict and a thug. His mother Delonda (Kelly Jenrette) did her best to keep things together. Jahkor ends up turning to petty thefts and assaults with his friend TQ (Isaiah John). Jahkor also ended up offering his services to gangster named Big Stunna (Yahya Abdul-Mateen II), while also having a relationship with a woman named Shantaye (Shakira Ja’nai Paye) with whom he ends up having a son named Zion. Although he tried to lead an honest lifestyle for his son, Jahkor always ended up in trouble.

Jahkor offered to kill Stunna's rival, Malcolm (Stephen Barrington), and he did so by executing Malcolm and his girlfriend Cece (Cydnee Barry) in front of their daughter Miesha (Bianca Richelle) in their home. It was revealed that as a child, Jahkor saw Malcolm selling his father JD drugs. He asked Malcolm to stop and was rebuffed. He blamed Malcolm for JD's ongoing drug use and the damage to his family. After his arrest, Jahkor learns that TQ and a former associate, T-Rex, were working for Malcolm. Stunna and his girlfriend murder T-Rex while Jahkor kills TQ when he ends up in prison.

Jahkor meets his son when Shantaye brings him along with her and also assures that his son will not end up like him or JD. Jahkor and JD also work on their relationship behind bars.

Cast
 Ashton Sanders as Jahkor Abraham Lincoln
 Jalyn Emil Hall as young Jahkor
 Jeffrey Wright as James Daniel Lincoln "JD"
 Regina Taylor as Tommetta
 Yahya Abdul-Mateen II as Big Stunna
 Christopher Meyer as Lamark
 Andrea Lynn Ellsworth as Kim
 Baily Hopkins as Ms. Ferguson
 Gretchen Klein as Debbie
 Andray Johnson as Mr. Hudson
 Stephen Barrington as Malcolm
 Rolanda D. Bell as La-Trice
 Isaiah John as TQ
 Kelly Jenrette as Delanda
 Shakira Ja'nai Paye as Shantaye

Production
On March 20, 2018, it was announced that Netflix had greenlit a new film entitled All Day and a Night written and directed by Joe Robert Cole. In July 2018, Ashton Sanders, Jeffrey Wright, Yahya Abdul-Mateen II, and Regina Taylor joined the cast of the film.  In August 2018, Jalyn Hall and Christopher Meyer joined the cast of the film.

Principal photography began on July 30, 2018.

Release
It was released on May 1, 2020.

Reception
The website's critical consensus reads, "All Day and a Night addresses worthy issues with thoughtfulness and care, although its effectiveness is undermined by a disappointingly familiar story." On Metacritic, the film has a weighted average score of 60 out of 100 based on 15 critics, indicating "mixed or average reviews".

References

External links 
 

American drama films
2020 films
Films set in Oakland, California
Films scored by Michael Abels
English-language Netflix original films
2020s English-language films
Hood films
2020s American films